Louis Jordan was an American popular music innovator who recorded from the 1930s until the 1970s.  During the 1940s, he was the most popular recording artist of the soon-to-be-called rhythm and blues music.  Jordan had eighteen No. 1 hits, which places him as the third most successful singles artist in Billboard R&B charts history.  His 1946 recording of "Choo Choo Ch'Boogie" is tied for second place for spending the most weeks (eighteen) at No. 1.  Jordan's success was not limited to the R&B market — he also had No. 1 hits on the Billboard Pop and Country charts.

The peak of Jordan's popularity occurred when the two-song record single was the typical format, before the emergence of the long-playing record album.  As a result, although he recorded prolifically, he had relatively few albums until compilations began appearing after his death in 1975.  Listed here are the singles and albums Jordan recorded during his career, as well as the more current and notable compilations.

Singles

1930s

1940s

V-Discs

1950s

1960s

Albums

Studio albums

Somebody Up There Digs Me (Mercury MG-20242, 1957)
Man, We're Wailin''' (Mercury MG-20331, 1958)One Sided Love – Then Sakatumi (Pzazz LP-321, 1968)I Believe in Music (Disques Black And Blue	33.059, 1973; CD reissue: Black & Blue BB-876, 1996)

Live albumsLive Jive (A Touch of Magic 4, 1994)

Compilation albumsThe Best of Louis Jordan (MCA 2-4079, 1975; CD reissue: 1989)Five Guys Named Moe (Original Decca Recordings, Vol. 2) (MCA 10503, 1992)Let the Good Times Roll (The Complete Decca Recordings 1938–1954) (Bear Family BCD-15557, 1992) 9-CD Louis Jordan on Film 1942–1948 (Krazy Kat KKCD-17, 1996)Let the Good Times Roll (The Anthology 1938–1954) (MCA/Decca 2-11907, 1999) 2-CDJivin' with Jordan (Proper BOX 47, 2002) 4-CDThe Aladdin, "X" & Vik Recordings 1953–1955 (Rev-Ola CRBAND-2, 2006)Roc Doc! Louis Jordan on Mercury 1956–1957''	Rev-Ola CRREV-244, 2008)

Notes

References

Discographies of American artists
Rhythm and blues discographies
Blues discographies
Jazz discographies
Louis Jordan songs